Freud: The Secret Passion, or simply Freud, is a 1962 American biographical drama film directed by John Huston and produced by Wolfgang Reinhardt. Based on the life of Austrian neurologist Sigmund Freud, it stars Montgomery Clift as Freud and Susannah York as his patient Cecily Koertner. Other cast members include Larry Parks, Susan Kohner, Eileen Herlie, Eric Portman and David McCallum.  The screenplay was by Charles Kaufman and Reinhardt, with some elements from a script by Jean-Paul Sartre, who withdrew his name from the film.

The film was theatrically released in the United States by Universal-International on December 12, 1962, and was selected to compete for the Golden Bear in the competition section at the 13th Berlin International Film Festival. It was nominated for two Academy Awards and four Golden Globe Awards, including Best Motion Picture – Drama and Best Actress in a Motion Picture – Drama for York.

Plot
The film begins with a voice-over narration by director John Huston, describing the story as "Freud's descent into a region almost as black as hell itself--man's unconscious--and how he let in the light."  Huston's voice-overs also occur at the film's ending and substitute for Freud's thoughts in some scenes,

In 1885 Vienna, young doctor Sigmund Freud has completed his medical training and finds himself at odds with hospital head Theodore Meynert, especially regarding the status of "hysteria" as a psychological disorder. With his mother's encouragement, Freud goes to Paris to study the condition with Dr. Jean-Marin Charcot, who has made some advances with the help of hypnosis but still has not been able to fully cure his patients.

Returning to Vienna, Freud marries Martha Bernays and sets up practice, trying Charcot's techniques to cure different patients of their neuroses. He is especially upset and driven to unsettling dreams, however, when one patient, Carl von Schlosser (David McCallum), stabs his soldier father's uniform and fondles the female mannequin beneath it.  Although tempted to live a more routine life as a doctor, Freud partners with another doctor, Josef Breuer, who has made some progress by getting his patients to talk about their conditions while under hypnosis.

Together, Breuer and Freud treat Cecily Koertner (a fictional character based in part on Freud's patient "Anna O").  When it becomes apparent that Cecily is sexually attracted to Breuer, he leaves her treatment to Freud, who eventually foregoes hypnotism and has her recount her dreams and to free-associate words, memories, and ideas.  Cecily's attachment to Breuer transfers to Freud, but despite Martha's concerns he presses on through different layers of Cecily's unconscious.  Freud also begins to examine his own neuroses and dreams, leading him to the concepts of child sexuality and the Oedipus complex, concepts that Breuer is unable to accept.

At a lecture to other doctors and psychologists, Freud's ideas are received with derision, but a few people defend his willingness to break out of old habits and prejudices in search of the truth.  Huston's narration closes with the "words carved on the temple at Delphi: Know thyself. . . . This knowledge is now within our grasp. Will we use it? Let us hope."

Cast

Production history

In 1958, John Huston decided to make a film about the life of the young Sigmund Freud, and asked Jean-Paul Sartre to write a summary of a projected scenario. Sartre submitted a synopsis of 95 pages, which was accepted, but later completed a finished script that, if filmed, would have amounted to a running time of five hours, which Huston considered far too long. Huston suggested cuts, but Sartre submitted an even longer script of eight hours, justifying the even longer version by saying, "On peut faire un film de quatre heures s'il s'agit de Ben Hur, mais le public de Texas ne supporterait pas quatre heures de complexes" ("We can make a film of four hours in the case of Ben Hur, but the Texas public couldn't stand four hours of complexes."). Huston and Sartre quarreled, and Sartre withdrew his name from the film's credits. Nevertheless, many key elements from Sartre's script survive in the finished film, such as the creation of the composite patient Cecily, who combines features of Freud's patients Anna O., Elisabeth von R., Dora, and others.  After Sartre's death, his screenplay was published separately as The Freud Scenario.

Sartre and Huston were both interested in casting Marilyn Monroe as Cecily, but she turned down the offer and Susannnah York was cast instead.  Huston cast Larry Parks as Joseph Breuer in part to redeem Parks' career after being blacklisted, but this proved to be the actor's last film. Huston had previously worked with Montgomery Clift (and Monroe) on The Misfits (1961), but found himself uncomfortable with Clift's drug and alcohol problems, exacerbated by vision problems due to cataracts, and by his homosexuality.  Freud proved to be Clift's next-to-last film performance.  Filming took place over five months in Munich and Vienna and cost approximately four million dollars, twice the original budget.  To satisfy the Production Code Authority,  Huston cut the film's original length of over three hours to two hours and fifty minutes, but the studio cut an additional half-hour before the film was released.

Background 
The film heavily compresses events, cases and acquaintances early in Freud's career, spanning from his work at the Vienna General Hospital under Theodor Meynert during the mid-1880s, through his research into hysteria and his seduction theory along with Breuer, up until his development of infantile sexuality and the Oedipus complex around the turn of the century that became the basis for his fundamental Three Essays on the Theory of Sexuality, first published in 1905.

The character of Cecily Körtner is based upon a number of early patients of Freud's, most heavily drawing on the Anna O. case but also Dora and others. Similarly, the character of Josef Breuer and his role as mentor and friend in Freud's life as portrayed by Larry Parks is in fact a combination of the real Breuer with Wilhelm Fliess.

Reception

Box office 
Although Freud received a share of positive reviews and award nominations, it earned only $2.9 million, well below its production cost.

Critical reception

Contemporary reviews 
Just prior to the film's U.S. premier, Huston wrote a column for The New York Times describing his intentions in making Freud.  Times film critic Bosley Crowther selected the film as one of the ten best of 1962, describing it as "stark, intense and penetrating" and Clift's performance as "eerily illuminating."  Other reviews were mixed, with Time magazine praising the film, but Newsweek dismissing it.  Critic John Simon described it as "respectful and, Lord knows, serious," while the journal Films and Filming called it a "period piece,"  Film scholar Ernest Callenbach described it as "a  feature-length classroom film."  Nonetheless, the film received two Academy Award nominations (for Best Original Screenplay and Best Music) and four Golden Globe nominations (for Best Motion Picture, Actress, Supporting Actress, and Director).  Huston was nominated for the Golden Bear award at the 1963 Berlin Film Festival and by the Directors Guild of America.  The Writers Guild of America also nominated Charles Kaufman and Wolfgang Reinhardt for their screenplay.

Other assessments 
{{blockquote|... it's a fascinating attempt to mix a traditional biopic with more experimental elements, such as rather surreal dreams sequences.As director John Huston's voiceover suggests, it's a film that's less interested in Freud himself than the possibilities of unlocking the human mind and how that can be shown on screen – how can you portray the ideas of psychology on screen? As a result it plays fast and loose with history in favour of trying to uncover what Freud's ideas mean. It is an interesting and entertaining movie, with a great central performance from Montgomery Clift.| Tim Isaac (Big Gay Picture Show)|Freud (DVD)<ref>Isaac, Tim (2012). [http://www.biggaypictureshow.com/bgps/2012/04/freud-dvd/ Freud (DVD)], Big Gay Picture Show, April 23, 2012</ref>}}

 Accolades 

 Reception in France 
Élisabeth Roudinesco comments that Freud: The Secret Passion, "did not have any success. And yet the black and white photography of Douglas Slocombe recaptures superbly the baroque universe of fin de siècle Vienna. As for Montgomery Clift, he portrays an anguished, somber and fragile Freud, closer to the James Dean of Rebel without a Cause than to the mummified figure imposed by the official historians of psychoanalysis: a character, in any event, more Sartrean than Jonesian. The work was distributed to the movie houses of Paris at the beginning of June 1964, two weeks before Lacan's foundation of the Ėcole freudienne de Paris. It went completely unnoticed by the psychoanalysts of Paris, who failed to find in it the hero of their imagination." Sartre did not see the film.

Soundtrack
The mostly dissonant, atonal score to Freud was one of the early works by composer Jerry Goldsmith with an electronic music sequence by Henk Badings.  It garnered Goldsmith his first Oscar nomination. The "Main Title" from Freud, as well as the tracks "Charcot's Show" and "Desperate Case" later were purchased and reused without consent of Goldsmith by director Ridley Scott for the acid blood scene and others in the film Alien (1979), also scored by Goldsmith.

 Home media 
Having previously been unavailable in a home media format, Freud: The Secret Passion was eventually released in the UK by Transition Digital Media in a 1.78:1 letter-boxed, non-anamorphic 4:3 format, on a Region 2 DVD edition on April 23, 2012.  In the U.S., Kino Lorber Studio Classics released a new 2K transfer on standard DVD and Blu-ray on November 30, 2021.

See also
 List of American films of 1962

References

 Further reading 
Holland, Norman N. (1994). John Huston, Freud, 1962 (adapted essay from an earlier version published in How to See Huston's Freud: Perspectives on John Huston'', Ed. Stephen Cooper. Perspectives on Film Series. New York: G. K. Hall, 1994. 164–83.)

External links
"Huston, Sartre and the Freud Scenario - The story behind Sartre and Huston's "collaboration" on the script for "Freud"
Freud: The Secret Passion at Rotten Tomatoes

1960s historical drama films
1962 films
American black-and-white films
American biographical drama films
American historical drama films
1960s English-language films
1960s biographical drama films
Films directed by John Huston
Cultural depictions of Sigmund Freud
Cultural depictions of Josef Breuer
Films scored by Jerry Goldsmith
Films set in the 1880s
Films set in 1890
Films set in Vienna
Biographical films about physicians
Films about hypnosis
1962 drama films
1960s American films